Dr George Mukhari Hospital is an Academic Hospital situated in the north of Pretoria near the township of Ga-Rankuwa. The previous name was Ga-Rankuwa Hospital. It is a teaching facility for the Sefako Makgatho Health Sciences University formerly known as Medical University of Southern Africa/University of Limpopo Medunsa Campus.

External links
 https://web.archive.org/web/20111006054944/http://www.ewn.co.za/articleprog.aspx?id=57768
 http://wikimapia.org/4338795/Dr-George-Mukhari-Academic-Hospital
 http://www.sanews.gov.za/south-africa/gauteng-health-puts-george-mukhari-hospital-high-agenda

Buildings and structures in Pretoria
Hospitals in Gauteng
Teaching hospitals in South Africa
University of Limpopo